Uzbekistan first competed at the Asian Games in 1994.

Medal tables

References